Su Wei (born July 28, 1989) is a Chinese professional basketball player. He currently plays for the Guangdong Southern Tigers of the Chinese Basketball Association. Born in Rizhao, Shandong, he is also a member of the China men's national basketball team

Professional career

Su has spent the first five years of his career with the Guangdong Southern Tigers of the Chinese Basketball Association after signing with the team in 2006 as a 17-year-old.  In the 2009-10 season, he had his best season to date, averaging 5.3 points and 3.3 rebounds per game for the team.  He has helped the Tigers win three CBA titles.

Chinese national team
Su was a part of the Chinese national junior basketball team that competed at the FIBA Under-19 World Championship 2007.  He averaged 11.8 points and 6.2 rebounds per game for the 12th-placed Chinese team.  He made his debut for the senior team at the FIBA Asia Championship 2009; at 20 years of age, he was the second youngest Chinese player at the tournament.  He saw action in five of nine games for the silver medal-winning Chinese team.  With the silver medal performance, China qualified for the 2010 FIBA World Championship.

References

1989 births
Living people
Basketball players from Shandong
Chinese men's basketball players
Centers (basketball)
Guangdong Southern Tigers players
People from Rizhao
Qingdao Eagles players
Xinjiang Flying Tigers players
2010 FIBA World Championship players